Alastair Turner Baillie (24 December 1932 – 18 November 2009) was a British diplomat. He served as Governor of Anguilla from 1983 to 1987.

References 

1932 births
2009 deaths
Members of HM Diplomatic Service
Governors of Anguilla
Alumni of Christ's College, Cambridge
Queen's Own Cameron Highlanders officers
Colonial Service officers